Adriano Pitarelli (born 9 March 1975), known as Pitarelli, is a Brazilian retired footballer who played as a goalkeeper.

References

External links

1975 births
Living people
Footballers from São Paulo (state)
Brazilian footballers
Association football goalkeepers
Campeonato Brasileiro Série A players
Campeonato Brasileiro Série B players
Guarani FC players
Mogi Mirim Esporte Clube players
Sport Club do Recife players
Associação Atlética Portuguesa (Santos) players
Santos FC players
Sociedade Esportiva do Gama players
Oeste Futebol Clube players
Avaí FC players
União Agrícola Barbarense Futebol Clube players
América Futebol Clube (SP) players
Clube Esportivo Nova Esperança players
Rio Preto Esporte Clube players
Sertãozinho Futebol Clube players
Associação Atlética Francana players
Ituano FC players
People from Jales